The Henry Jewett Players (c.1910s–1930s) was a repertory theatre troupe established by actor Henry Jewett in Boston, Massachusetts. The group operated from the Boston Opera House (c.1915); the Toy Theatre and Copley Theatre on Dartmouth Street (c.1916–1924); and the Repertory Theatre on Huntington Avenue (c.1925–1930). Performers included Peg Entwistle and Conway Wingfield. A contemporary critic explained how the players worked: "Mr Jewett ... considers the term 'Stock Company' beneath the just merits and present ambitions of his organization, and insists that it be dignified by the name 'Repertory,' instead. There is justification for this to the extent that no member regularly plays 'leading' parts, but all are moved around in the cast from week to week, from important to minor roles. But the company is nevertheless not run on the European Repertory system by means of which several plays are put on within the week, but instead, follows the usual American fashion of playing each play for a week or more at a time." The Jewett Players continued until around 1930.

Images

Performances
Among the group's productions:

 Ibsen's Pillars of Society
 Dusany's Lost Silk Hat
 Angel in the House
 Inside the Lines
 Pinero's Dandy Dick
 Galsworthy's The Pigeon
 Galsworthy's The Silver Box
 Shaw's plays
 The Rivals a comedy by Richard Sheridan, 1917-1918 season.
 Tom Jones
 Alfred Sutro's Walls of Jericho
 The Doctor's Dilemma
 Graham Moffat's Bunty Pulls the Strings
 Officer 666
 The Private Secretary
 Are you a Mason?
 Charley's Aunt
 Chains
 Hindle Wakes
 Strife
 The Thunderbolt
 Oscar Wilde plays
 J. M. Barrie plays
 H.A. Jones plays
 Granville Barker's The Voysey Inheritance
 St. John Hankin's Cassilis Engagement
 Gregorio Martínez Sierra's Romantic Young Lady

See also
 Huntington Theatre Company, which now resides in the former Repertory Theatre (built in 1925 for the Jewett Players; bought in 1953 by Boston University)

References

Further reading

 Mary E. Carroll. "The Henry Jewett players, a notable dramatic achievement." National Magazine, March 1918
 Caroline Hills Allen. "The Frances Jewett Repertory Theatre Club." Smith Alumnae Quarterly, Feb. 1922
 Frances H. Jewett. The Repertory Theatre Idea. Boston: Frances Jewett Repertory Theatre Club, Copley Theatre, 1922
 Chapters on H. Jewett in: 
 Eric McHenry. "A haunting on Huntington: Theater imbued with spirit of founder." B.U. Bridge, Oct. 8, 1999

Cultural history of Boston
20th century in Boston
Theatre companies in Boston
Back Bay, Boston